Nevada's 13th Senate district is one of 21 districts in the Nevada Senate. It has been represented by Democrat Julia Ratti since 2016, succeeding late fellow Democrat Debbie Smith.

Geography
District 13 covers much of central Reno and Sparks in Washoe County.

The district is located entirely within Nevada's 2nd congressional district, and overlaps with the 24th and 30th districts of the Nevada Assembly.

Recent election results
Nevada Senators are elected to staggered four-year terms; since 2012 redistricting, the 13th district has held regularly-scheduled elections in midterm years, and off-cycle elections due in 2012 (due to Sheila Leslie's resignation) and 2016 (due to Debbie Smith's death).

2018

2016

2014

2012

Federal and statewide results in District 13

References 

13
Washoe County, Nevada